Hieronymus, in English pronounced  or , is the Latin form of the Ancient Greek name  (Hierṓnymos), meaning "with a sacred name". It corresponds to the English given name Jerome.

Variants
 Albanian: Jeronimi
 Arabic: جيروم (Jerome)
 Basque: Jeronimo
 Belarusian: Еранім (Yeranim)
 Bulgarian: Йероним (Yeronim)
 Catalan: Jeroni
 Written Chinese: 希罗尼穆斯
 Chinese Pinyin: xī luó ní mù sī
 Croatian: Jeronim
 Czech: Jeroným, Jeronýmus (archaic)
 Danish: Hieronymus
 Dutch: Hiëronymus, Jeroen
 English: Jerome, Hieronymus, Geromy, Rhonemus
 Esperanto: Hieronimo
 Estonian: Hieronymus
 Finnish: Hieronymus
 Flemish: Jerom
 French: Jérôme, Gérôme
 Galician Xerome
 German: Hieronymus
 Ancient Greek :  (Hierṓnymos)
 Modern Greek: Ιερώνυμος (Ierónymos)
 Hebrew: הירונימוס (Hieronymus)
 Hungarian: Jeromos
 Indonesian: Hieronimus
 Interlingua: Jeronimo
 Italian: Girolamo, Gerolamo, Geronimo, Geromino
 Japanese: ヒエロニムス (Hieronimusu)
 Korean: 히에로니무스 (Hieronimuseu), 제롬 (Jerom)
 Latin: Hieronymus
 Lithuanian: Jeronimas
 Malayalam: ജെറോം
 Norwegian: Hieronymus
 Polish: Hieronim
 Portuguese: Jerónimo, Brazilian Jerônimo, or Jeronymo as an Azorian family name
 Romanian: Ieronim
 Russian: Иероним (Iyeronim)
 Sardinian: Ziròminu
 Dutch Low Saxon: Hiëronymus
 Serbian: Јероним (Jeronim)
 Slovak: Hieronym
 Spanish: Jerónimo
 Swahili: Jeromu
 Swedish: Hieronymus
 Tagalog: Jeronimo, Geronimo
 Thai: เจอโรม (Čhoerom), เยโรม (Yoerom; a historical distorted interpretation of the name) 
 Ukrainian: Єронім (Yeronim), Єроним (Yeronym), Ієронім (Iyeronim)
 Vietnamese: Giêrônimô

People with the name

As a given name
 Eusebius Sophronius Hieronymus, better known as Saint Jerome (c. 347 – 420) 
 Hiëronymus Emiliani, better known as St. Jerome Emiliani (1486–1537) 
 Hieronymus of Cardia, Greek general and historian
 Hieronymus of Rhodes, Greek peripatetic philosopher of the 3rd century BC
 Hieronymus of Syracuse, Greek tyrant
 Archbishop Ieronymos II of Athens
 Hieronymus, son of Charles Martel
 Hieronymus (bishop of Wrocław), early medieval Bishop of Wrocław, Poland from 1046 to 1062
 Hieronymus Bock, German botanist
 Hieronymus Bosch, Dutch artist
 Hieronymus Cardanus, also known as Girolamo Cardano or Jérôme Cardan, polymath, astrologer, gambler
 Hieronymus Cock, Flemish painter and etcher
 Hieronymus Fabricius, Italian anatomist
 Hieronymus Graf von Colloredo, Austrian Prince-Archbishop of Salzburg, Count of the Holy Roman Empire
 Hieronymus Karl Friedrich von Münchhausen, famous recounter of tall tales, fictionalized as Baron Munchausen (1720–1797) 
 Hieronymus Praetorius, German Composer
 Hieronymus Theodor Richter, German chemist
 Marcus Hieronymus Vida, 16th-century Italian poet and bishop
 Hieronymus Vietor (c. 1480–1546/47), printer in Vienna and Kraków
 Hieronymus Wierix, Flemish engraver
 Hieronymus Wolf, German historian
 Hieronymus Georg Zeuthen, Danish mathematician
 Hieronymus, pen name of Athalia Schwartz (1821-1871), Danish writer

As a surname
 Georg Hans Emmo Wolfgang Hieronymus, German botanist
 , German engineer
 Holger Hieronymus, German former football player

Fictional characters
 Detective Hieronymus "Harry" Bosch, a fictional character
 Charlie Hieronymus Pace, a character from the television series Lost
 Hieronymus Bump, a character from the animated fantasy television series The Owl House
 Hieronymus Frosch, a character (frog and inventor) created by 
 Hieronymus Fox, a character from the science-fiction television series Buck Rogers in the 25th century
 Hieronymus Glove from the animated American television series SpongeBob SquarePants

See also
 Hieronymus machine, a pseudoscientific device
 Geronimus (disambiguation)
 Geronimo (disambiguation)
 Jerónimo (disambiguation)
 Jerome (disambiguation)
 Saint Jerome (disambiguation)
 San Geronimo (disambiguation)
 San Jerónimo (disambiguation)